tAAt (short for tArzAn tuotanto, Finnish for tArzAn productions) is a Finnish humor-based demogroup founded in 1992 which is active in participating and organizing demoscene events. They are recognized outside of the demoscene for their Dismount series of computer games, including Stair Dismount (Porrasturvat), Truck Dismount (Rekkaturvat) and Dismount Levels.

tAAt also founded a non-profit organization, tAAt ry, in Finland, for the promotion of demoscene culture. tAAt ry has organized such computer competitions as the Text Mode Demo Contest and musitAAtio composing challenge.

References

External links 

tAAt productions list at pouët.net
demoscene.info, a demoscene information webportal
Dismount™ Games

1992 establishments in Finland
Demogroups
Non-profit organisations based in Finland
Finnish artist groups and collectives